The Game of Chess (or Portrait of the artist's sisters playing chess) is an oil on canvas painting by Italian Renaissance artist Sofonisba Anguissola from 1555. Anguissola was 23 years old when she painted it.

The painting is signed and dated on the edge of the chessboard, where Anguissola left this Latin inscription:  – "Sofonisba Angussola virgin daughter of Amilcare painted from life her three sisters and a maid 1555."

History
Giorgio Vasari, visiting Cremona, was a guest in the house of Amilcare Anguissola and there admired paintings by Amilcare's daughters. About The Game of Chess he wrote, "I have seen this year in Cremona, in the house of her father a painting made with much diligence, the depiction of his three daughters, in the act of playing chess, and with them an old housemaid, done with such diligence and facility, that they appear alive, and the only thing missing is speech." This is the oldest document that mentions this painting, that remained hanging in the Anguissola family house for several years.

The painting later arrived in Rome, together with the Self Portrait at a Spinet, and two of Anguissola's drawings (Child Bitten by a Lobster and another unidentified drawing) in the holdings of the humanist and collector Fulvio Orsini. They were then inherited by Cardinale Odoardo Farnese. The Game of Chess then turned up in Naples, after the Farnese inheritance had passed to the Bourbons, and it was eventually acquired by Luciano Bonaparte. It changed hands once more after this and arrived in the collection that today forms part of the National Museum in Poznan, Poland.

Three engravings based on this painting are known.

The painting has undergone evident repaintings.

Composition
In an agreeable garden Lucia, the third born of the Anguissola children, is moving some chess pieces; in front of her is Minerva, the fourth born, who is reacting to her adversary. She attracts the attention of the youngest sister, Europa (the fifth born) who is following the game and laughing. Minerva appears in a later painting (the Anguissola Family Portrait, but as an adolescent. The Portrait of Europa was painted by Lucia Anguissola possibly in the year after. Europa Anguissola is also identifiable as the child in the pencil drawing, Old Woman Studying the Alphabet with a Laughing Girl, today in the Uffizi, where the maid is also present, but older than the woman that appears in The Game of Chess.

Lucia is in action, while the housemaid observes the scene. There is a clear contrast in physiognomy between the younger (rich) women and the elder (common) woman. The young Anguissola women have jewels, embroidered clothes, and elaborate hairstyles. Minerva wears the same necklace as the Portrait of a Lady that is in Berlin and now identified as Bianca Ponzoni Anguissola – the mother of the three girls around the chessboard. The picture takes place in a domestic setting, circled with friendly figures, but the competitiveness of a game of chess is also visible. In the garden an old oak tree grows, laden in branches: it is a symbol of the solidity of family relationships. In the background is a light blue landscape, painted in the Flemish style.

Portrayal of Women Playing Chess
The extravagant, “queenly attire” the three Anguissola sisters wear serve as indications that Sofonisba Anguissola did not paint this scene to recreate a specific event of chess playing between the sisters. The luxurious costume Anguissola dresses her sisters in draws the connection back to the domestic traditions of embroidery or weaving, but by portraying this group immersed in an activity completely different from the normal skills that were vital to a girl's education during this time period, Anguissola shows these young women in a new realm.

The Game of Chess features an all-female group. New chess rules were in place in Italy by the time of the creation of Anguissola's painting, changing the hierarchy of power so that the queen held most importance out of all chess pieces. Anguissola includes her sisters and maidservant in this composition but excludes her younger brother, Asdrubale. The fully female cast is unlike many of the sixteenth-century artworks featuring games of chess that preceded it, like Giulio Campi’s The Chess Game or Lucas van Leyden’s Chess Game. Chess was part of the humanistic education and was considered an excellent intellectual exercise for a human; in contrast the card and dice games, which were forbidden to women, but they were based on luck and not on intelligence. Anguissola's work acts as a "self-celebration of women's accomplishments and talent" in how it challenges past "exclu[sions of] women from the representation of chess and an intellectual pursuit."

According to an old tradition, the chess alluded to a Battle of the Amazons. In his poem from 1550 entitled Scacchia Ludus (or The Game of Chess), the Cremonese poet and bishop of Alba, Marco Gerolamo Vida, sometimes called the queen virgo and sometimes amazon and said that it can move in any direction. The queens had the possibility of being resurrected from a pawn. In the final section Vida mentions a battle between two queens, in which the white queen dies and rises again. At the end the black queen checkmates the white. The battle painted by Anguissola alludes to the search for a conquering woman. With this the chessboard becomes an allegory and the true queens are the two Anguissola sisters, then spend their life virtuously, taking part in an educational exercise.

Further reading
 Women in chess
 Jill Burke, Overlooking Women’s Labour in Sofonisba Anguissola’s Chess Game, Blogpost, June 2020

References

External links

Portraits of women
Paintings in the collection of the National Museum, Poznań
Portraits by Sofonisba Anguissola
1550s paintings
Chess paintings
16th century in chess